Halysitidae is an extinct family of tabulate corals.

These tabulate corals lived from Ordovician to Devonian (from 471.8 to 412.3 Ma). Fossil corals of the family Halysitidae have been found in the sediments of Afghanistan, Canada, United States, Venezuela and Australia.

Genera
 Acanthohalysites Hamada 1957
 Catenipora Lamarck 1816
 Cystihalysites Chernyshev 1941
 Eocatenipora Hamada 1957
 Falsicatenipora Hamada 1958
 Halysites von Waldheim 1828
 Hexismia Sokolov 1955
 Quepora Sinclair 1955
 Schedohalysites Hamada 1957
 Solenihalysites Stasinska 1967
 Spumaeolites Zhizhina 1967

References

Tabulata
Prehistoric cnidarian families
Ordovician first appearances
Silurian extinctions